Taeniolethrinops is a small genus of haplochromine cichlids endemic to Lake Malawi.

Species
There are currently four recognized species in this genus:
 Taeniolethrinops cyrtonotus (Trewavas, 1931)
 Taeniolethrinops furcicauda (Trewavas, 1931)
 Taeniolethrinops laticeps (Trewavas, 1931)
 Taeniolethrinops praeorbitalis (Regan, 1922)

References

 
Haplochromini

Cichlid genera
Taxa named by Ethelwynn Trewavas